Budge House may refer to the following historic houses in Paris, Idaho

Alfred Budge House
Julia Budge House
Budge Cottage
Taft Budge Bungalow